Murong Long (慕容隆) (died 397), formally Prince Kang of Gaoyang (高陽康王), was a general and imperial prince of the Chinese/Xianbei state Later Yan. He was a son of the founding emperor Murong Chui (Emperor Wucheng) and a brother of Murong Bao (Emperor Huimin), and when his brother's empire was under threat from the rival Northern Wei's prince Tuoba Gui, he tried to save it, but was killed by his nephew Murong Hui, intent on seizing power from both his father and his uncles.

Before Later Yan's founding
The first reference to Murong Long in history was in 369, when Murong Chui, then a Former Yan prince, fled to Former Qin after he came after suspicion of the emperor Murong Wei's mother Empress Dowager Kezuhun and the regent Murong Ping; Murong Long was one of his sons who fled with him. When Murong Chui subsequently resolved to rebel against Former Qin after its emperor Fu Jiān was defeated at the Battle of Fei River in his attempt to conquer Jin and reunite China, Murong Long was involved in his first act of rebellion — massacring the Di soldiers that Murong Chui's deputy, Fu Feilong (苻飛龍), commanded. Murong Chui subsequently declared the independence of Later Yan in 384.

During Murong Chui's reign
Throughout the next few years, Murong Long largely served as a general directly under his father's command, as Later Yan tried to establish itself over the old territory of Former Yan. In 384, when Murong Chui was nearly trapped by an ambush by the Former Qin viceroy Fu Pi, Murong Long was the one who rescued him from the encounter. In 386, Murong Chui created him the Prince of Gaoyang. He continued to distinguish himself in campaigns against independent warlords and Jin generals. In 389, when his brother Murong Nong, himself a distinguished general, was recalled from his post as viceroy at the old Former Yan capital Longcheng (龍城, in modern Jinzhou, Liaoning), Murong Long replaced him as viceroy, and he followed Murong Nong's policies. The populace favored him as much as Murong Nong.

During Murong Chui's reign, Murong Nong and Murong Long were the most well-regarded princes. Because of this, Murong Chui's wife Empress Duan Yuanfei once suggested to him that the crown prince Murong Bao lacked abilities to govern, and Murong Chui should choose either Murong Nong or Murong Long instead. Murong Chui, believing Murong Bao to be capable, rejected her suggestion.

Around the new year 396, after an army commanded by Murong Bao had suffered a crushing defeat by Northern Wei's prince Tuoba Gui at the Battle of Canhe Slope, Murong Chui planned a second campaign against Northern Wei, and he recalled Murong Long and his troops back to the capital Zhongshan (中山, in modern Baoding, Hebei), replacing him as viceroy with Murong Bao's son Murong Hui the Duke of Qinghe. With Murong Long's fresh troops leading the way and with Murong Long and Murong Nong as forward commanders, the campaign against Northern Wei was initially successful, but as the army passed through Canhe Slope, they mourned in such a great manner that Murong Chui, in shame and anger, grew ill, and the army was forced to retreat. He died soon thereafter and was succeeded by Murong Bao.

During Murong Bao's reign
Murong Bao, although aware of Empress Duan's earlier suggestion to make Murong Nong or Murong Long crown prince (and in fact was so resentful of it that he forced her to commit suicide), appeared to trust his brothers greatly. However, in fall 396, Northern Wei launched a major campaign against Later Yan, and Tuoba Gui, after defeating Murong Nong and seizing Bing Province (并州, modern central and northern Shanxi), then advanced against Zhongshan. Murong Bao put another brother, Murong Lin the Prince of Zhao, in charge of Zhongshan's defenses, and Murong Lin advocated the strategy of defending the city and not engaging Northern Wei, much to Murong Long and Murong Nong's frustration.

In spring 397, after Murong Lin failed in a coup attempt, he fled out of the capital, and Murong Bao, in fear that Murong Lin would seize a relief force commanded by his son Murong Hui the Prince of Qinghe, decided to abandon Zhongshan. Murong Nong's and Murong Long's subordinates tried to persuade each to stay in Zhongshan rather than to follow Murong Bao, but each refused, feeling that loyalty to their brother required them to follow him. They therefore followed Murong Bao and joined Murong Hui's army.

However, Murong Hui was resentful that he was not made crown prince, a position given to his younger brother Murong Ce (慕容策), and he considered seizing the position by force. Murong Bao, realizing this, tried to transfer some of Murong Hui's army to the commands of Murong Nong and Murong Long, but this only made Murong Hui more resentful, and he acted first against his uncles, sending assassins against them. Murong Long was killed, but Murong Nong survived the attack but was severely wounded (described as having suffered a wound so deep that his brain was visible), and Murong Hui, who then openly declared a coup, was then defeated and killed.

Sons
Murong Chóng (慕容崇) (note different tone than Murong Chong the late emperor of Western Yan), the next Prince of Gaoyang, demoted to Duke and forced to commit suicide 398
Murong Cheng (慕容澄), Duke of Dongping, forced to commit suicide 398

397 deaths
Former Yan people
Former Qin people
Later Yan generals
Later Yan imperial princes
Year of birth missing